Muazzez is a Turkish given name for females. People named Muazzez include:

 Muazzez Abacı, Turkish singer
 Muazzez İlmiye Çığ, Turkish archaeologist
 Muazzez Ersoy, Turkish classical and folk singer
 Hatice Muazzez Sultan, wife of Ottoman Sultan Ibrahim I

See also
 3396 Muazzez, outer main-belt asteroid

Turkish feminine given names